Commerce is a branch of production that deals with the exchange of goods and services at any stage between a producer and a final consumer.

Commerce may also refer to:

Places
Commerce (river), in Normandy, France

United States
Commerce, California
 Commerce Casino, located there
Commerce, Georgia
 Commerce, Illinois, former name of Nauvoo, Illinois
Commerce, Missouri
Commerce, Oklahoma
Commerce, Texas
Commerce Township, Michigan
Commerce Township, Scott County, Missouri

Other uses
Commerce (card game), an 18th-century French gambling card game
Commerce (Paris Métro), a railway station in Paris, France
, one of several merchant vessels by that name
United States Department of Commerce, the Cabinet department of the United States government concerned with promoting economic growth
The Glory of Commerce, public sculpture at Grand Central Terminal, in New York City